Taichung County was a county in central Taiwan between 1945 and 2010. The county seat was in Yuanlin Township before 1950 and Fongyuan City after 1950.

History
Taichung County was established on 26 November 1945 on the territory of Taichū Prefecture shortly after the end of World War II. In the early years, Taichung County consists of most territory of Taichū Prefecture except the territory near cities of Taichū (Taichung) and Shōka (Changhua). The county is subdivide into districts, which is reformed from Japanese districts. The districts are divided into townships.

On 16 August 1950, another division reform was implemented. The southern part of the county was separated and established Changhua County and Nantou County. The remaining Taichung County has territory equivalent to the Toyohara (Fengyüan), Tōsei (Tungshih), Taikō (Tachia), and Daiton (Tatun) in the Japanese era. In addition, districts in the remaining part of Taichung County was defunct. All townships were directly controlled by the County Government. On 25 December 2010, the county merged with Taichung City to form a larger single special municipality.

Administration 
The subdivisions of the County remained mostly stable between 1950 and 2010. However, some changed has also been made.
 1 Oct 1955, Neipu Township was renamed Houli Township
 7 Jun 1973, two northeast most villages in Hoping Township was separated to form a new county-level division — Lishan Constructing Administrative Bureau.
 1 Mar 1973, Fengyuan reformed from an urban township to a county-administered city for its population.
 18 Feb 1982, Lishan Constructing Administrative Bureau dissolved, the two villages returned to Hoping Township.
 1 Nov 1993, Tali reformed from a rural township to a county-administered city for its population.
 1 Aug 1996, Taiping reformed from a rural township to a county-administered city for its population.
In 25 Dec 2010, The county was merged with Taichung City, all cities and townships became districts. On the eve of merging with Taichung City, the county consists of the following administrative divisions

Transportation 
 Freeway
 Freeway 1 (Taiwan)
 Freeway 3 (Taiwan)
 Freeway 4 (Taiwan)
 Railways
 Taichung line
 West Coast line (Taiwan)
 High-speed rail
 Taichung HSR station
 Harbor 
 Port of Taichung
 Airport
 Taichung International Airport

Other

Education 
 Asia University
 Providence University
 Taichung Japanese School

Hospitals 
 Jen-Ai Hospital - Dali (大里仁愛醫院)
 Taichung Tzu Chi General Hospital (台中慈濟醫院)

See also
 Taichung

References

External links
Taichung County Government Official Website 

Taichung
Former counties of Taiwan
1945 establishments in Taiwan
2010 disestablishments in Taiwan